Season 1 of the American competitive television series BattleBots premiered on Comedy Central on August 23, 2000.  Season 1 of BattleBots was hosted by Bil Dwyer and Sean Salisbury. Legendary boxing ring announcer and radio host Mark Beiro acted as the BattleBots arena announcer. Donna D'Errico, along with twins Randy and Jason Sklar were the arena-side correspondents.

The pilot, known as episode one was originally aired as a Pay-per-view event before being pitched to network executives.

Classifications

Robots in season 1 competed in four separate weight classes:
Lightweight – Contestants 
Middleweight – Contestants
Heavyweight – Contestants
Super Heavyweight – Contestants

Lightweight

Qualifying
Only one match in the lightweight category was aired during the qualifying round. The winner of each battle moved on to the Round of 16 along with eight teams that were automatically qualified.

 The robot was the winner the battle.
 The robot was the loser of the battle and was eliminated.

Tournament

 The robot was the winner the battle.
 The robot was the loser of the battle and was eliminated.
 The robot became the winner of "BattleBots" for the lightweight classification.

Middleweight

Qualifying
Two matches in the middleweight category were aired during the qualifying round. The winner of each battle moved on to the Quarterfinals along with four teams that were automatically qualified.

 The robot was the winner the battle.
 The robot was the loser of the battle and was eliminated.

Tournament

 The robot was the winner the battle.
 The robot was the loser of the battle and was eliminated.
 The robot became the winner of "BattleBots" for the middleweight classification.

Heavyweight

Qualifying
The winner of each battle moved on to the Round of 16 along with twelve teams that were automatically qualified.

 The robot was the winner the battle.
 The robot was the loser of the battle and was eliminated.

Tournament

 The robot was the winner the battle.
 The robot was the loser of the battle and was eliminated.
 The robot became the winner of "BattleBots" for the heavyweight classification.

Superheavyweight

Qualifying
Three matches in the Super Heavyweight category were aired during the qualifying round. The winner of each battle moved on to the Quarterfinals along with one team that was automatically qualified.

 The robot was the winner the battle.
 The robot was the loser of the battle and was eliminated.

Tournament

 The robot was the winner the battle.
 The robot was the loser of the battle and was eliminated.
 The robot became the winner of "BattleBots" for the Super heavyweight classification.

Episodes

References

BattleBots
2000 American television seasons